Howry is a surname. Notable people with the surname include:

Bob Howry (born 1973), American baseball player
Charles Bowen Howry (1844–1928), American politician, attorney, and judge
Keenan Howry (born 1981), American football player
Lyle Howry, American film producer and philanthropist

See also
Howrey (surname)